Kaipara College is a secondary school in Helensville, New Zealand. The current principal, as of Term 3 2021, is Cindy Sullivan.

History
The school began as Helensville District High School in 1924, and changed its name to Kaipara College in 1959.

A fire destroyed two classrooms and many resources in December 2006.

Since 2010, the school has been under reconstruction. The science, English, social studies blocks and canteen were knocked down and are being rebuilt. There are more plans for the college to be reconstructed further.

Style of Education
Kaipara College employs a mid-range teacher to student ratio, with around the 20-30 students per class mark.

The school uses a 'card' system to discipline or commend behavior. There are four types of cards: green cards are used to commend good work and can be entered into a draw to receive prizes at the end of term; orange cards warn the students; red cards send the student to the Dean's office and white cards place the student at the head of faculty's classroom for that period.

The school also has its own tuck shop which is run by Helensville District Health Trust and the food is prepared at Te Whare Oranga ō Parakai.

Demographics
According to the 2017 Education Review Office report, the school had 654 pupils out of which 15 were international. Out of those, 54% were male and 46% were female. The racial markup was 66% Pākehā, 28% Māori, 3% Pacific 2% Asian  and 1% other races.

Notable alumni
Notable alumni include All Black Tony Woodcock, Manawatu Standard Editor Michael Cummings, veteran broadcaster Dave Grove, Charles Philip Littlejohn (Clerk of the New Zealand House of Representatives) and New Zealand Champion Motocross rider Chris Birch.

References

External links
Kaipara College Website

Secondary schools in Auckland
Rodney Local Board Area
Educational institutions established in 1924
1924 establishments in New Zealand